The Mitsuoka Ray is a compact car produced by Mitsuoka. The first generation was a heavily modified 3rd generation Mazda Carol. It has a 52-58 hp 660 cc gasoline engine. It has a 30-40L fuel tank. The car started out with 3 doors; however, in 1999 Mitsuoka changed it into a 5-door car based on the 4th generation Mazda Carol and then 1st generation Mira Gino in 2002. The price ranges from 911,000 yen to 1,359,750 yen. Mitsuoka described the Ray as "like a dignified and graceful flower."

Trims

There are two trim levels for the first generation, Basic and Deluxe. Later, only available in single "Base Grade" trim for the last two generations.

Reception

The Mitsuoka Ray received mixed reviews, earning a place on the Ugliest Cars in Britain list due to problems with quality and design.  However, it was chosen the most attractive car in Australia.

Gallery

References

Mitsuoka vehicles
Compact cars
Front-wheel-drive vehicles

Retro-style automobiles
Cars introduced in 1996
2000s cars